Charles O'Brien (19 May 1921 – 15 December 1980) was an Australian cricketer. He played one first-class matches for New South Wales in 1945/46.

See also
 List of New South Wales representative cricketers

References

External links
 

1921 births
1980 deaths
Australian cricketers
New South Wales cricketers
Cricketers from Sydney